Leyshon (also: Layson, Laysham, Leyson) is an Anglicized form of the Welsh language surname Lleision. The name originates from Glamorganshire, Wales and dates from the 6th Century Welsh/Brythonic language.

Notable people with the name include:

Leyshon
 Nell Leyshon, British playwright and novelist
 William Leyshon (born 1976), Australian rugby league footballer

Leyson
 Armando Leyson (born 1956), Mexican politician
Leon Leyson (1929–2013), Polish-American  Holocaust survivor and author
 Thomas Leyson (16th century), Welsh poet and physician

Layson
 Roberto Layson, Filipino priest

Surnames of Welsh origin